The Tueni family is a prominent Christian Greek Orthodox Lebanese family. It is one of the original aristocratic “Seven Families” of Beirut, along with the Bustros, Fayad, Araman, Sursock, Ferneini, and Trad families, who constituted the traditional high society of Beirut for a long time.
Members of the Tueni family include:
Gebran Tueni (1957–2005), Lebanese journalist, politician, Member of Parliament, assassinated  
Gebran Tueni (journalist) (died 1948), Lebanese journalist, founder of the newspapers Al Ahrar and An-Nahar
Ghassan Tueni (1926–2012), Lebanese journalist, ambassador, politician, government minister, Member of Parliament
Nadia Tueni (1935–1983), Lebanese Francophone poet and wife of Ghassan Tueni
Nayla Tueni (born 1982), Lebanese journalist, politician and Member of Parliament, daughter of Gebran Tueni

Lebanese families